Nathaniel N. Whiting (June 19, 1792 – June 18, 1872) was a Baptist Preacher in New York. He was a professor of Biblical Languages at Lexington College and worked on Bible translation. He supported the work of William Miller, but shied away from fixing a particular date for Christ's return. For a time he was editor of The Williamsburg Daily Gazette.
It is said that he was the first man who ever reported a sermon for a newspaper.

Works
The Good News of Our Lord Jesus, the Anointed, from the Critical Greek of Tittmann (1849)
Origin, Nature, and Influence of Neology

References

1792 births
1872 deaths
Baptist ministers from the United States
Adventism
American biblical scholars
Translators of the Bible into English
19th-century translators